Myxaster is a genus of deep-sea velatid sea stars containing three species.

Taxonomy
List of species according to World Register of Marine Species:
 Myxaster medusa (Fisher, 1913)
 Myxaster perrieri Koehler, 1896
 Myxaster sol Perrier, 1885

References

Velatida